Valentin Konstantinovich Khromov ( 2 December 1933 – 11 November 2020) was a Russian poet.

Biography
Born in Moscow on 2 December 1933, Khromov studied alongside the artist Anatoly Zverev. He graduated from the Institute of Foreign Languages. He was one of the first poets of his generation to utilize the palindrome.

In the mid-1950s, Khromov joined the Poets of the Mansard, one of the first circles of poets attempting to overcome censorship by the Soviet Union. He wrote several critical works on poetry, as well as essays on artists and poets.

Valentin Khromov died on 11 November 2020, at the age of 86.

References

1933 births
2020 deaths
Russian poets
Writers from Moscow